Palometa is a name used for several species of fish:

Freshwater
Catoprion mento, the wimple piranha from several South American river basins
Metynnis, a genus of serrasalmid from several South American river basins
Myloplus rubripinnis, the redhook  myleus from several South American river basins
Mylossoma, a genus of serrasalmid from several South American river basins
Pristobrycon striolatus, a piranha from the Amazon and Orinoco Basins
Pygocentrus cariba, the black spot piranha from the Orinoco and Llanos
Pygocentrus nattereri, the red-bellied piranha from several South American river basins
Pygocentrus palometa, a piranha from the Orinoco Basin
Pygopristis denticulata, a piranha from several South American river basins
Serrasalmus, a genus of piranha from several South American river basins

Marine
Beryx, a genus of alfonsinos
Brama, a genus of pomfrets
Maracaibo leatherjacket, Oligoplites palometa, a species in the genus Oligoplites
Taractichthys, a genus of pomfrets
Trachinotus goodei, a Caribbean and West Atlantic gamefish

See also
Palometa River